Henry Beaufort, 2nd Earl of Somerset (probably 26 November 1401 – 25 November 1418) was an English nobleman who died aged 17 at the Siege of Rouen in France during the Hundred Years' War, fighting for the Lancastrian cause. As he died unmarried without issue his heir became his younger brother John Beaufort, 1st Duke of Somerset, 3rd Earl of Somerset.

Origins
He was the eldest son and heir of John Beaufort, 1st Earl of Somerset (1371-1410), the eldest of the four legitimised sons of John of Gaunt, 1st Duke of Lancaster (a younger son of King Edward III) by his mistress Katherine Swynford. His mother was Margaret Holland (1385-1439), a  daughter of Thomas Holland, 2nd Earl of Kent, the son of Joan "the Fair Maid of Kent", a grand-daughter of King Edward I and wife of Edward the Black Prince (eldest brother of John of Gaunt) and mother of King Richard II

Career
Henry succeeded his father as Earl of Somerset on 16 March 1410. During his minority his mother held his lands for him until he reached the age of 15.

Death and succession
He died aged sixteen at the Siege of Rouen during the Hundred Years' War, where he fought under the command of his uncle Thomas Beaufort, Duke of Exeter. He died unmarried and was succeeded by his younger brother John Beaufort, 1st Duke of Somerset, 3rd Earl of Somerset (1404-1444).

References

1401 births
1418 deaths
Henry Beaufort, 2nd Earl of Somerset
Earls of Somerset